was a  after Eien and before Shōryaku. This period spanned the years from August 988 through  November 990.

Change of era
 989 : The new era name was created to mark an event or a number of events. The previous era ended and a new one commenced in Eien 2, on the 8th day of the 8th month of 989.

Events of Eiso era
 989 (Eiso 1, 1st month): Emperor Ichijō made a personal visit to the home of his father, the retired Emperor En'yū, who is now known as Kongō Hō.
 989 (Eiso 1, 5th month): Fujiwara no Kaneie fell ill, and his son, Fujiwara no Michitaka, was chosen as regent (Kampaku) in his place. Kaneie retired from public life. He shaved his head and became a Buddhist monk.
 July 26, 989 (Eiso 2, 2nd day of the 7th month): Fujiwara no Kaneie died at age 62, and his home was converted into a Buddhist temple.

Notes

References
 Brown, Delmer M. and Ichirō Ishida, eds. (1979).  Gukanshō: The Future and the Past. Berkeley: University of California Press. ;  OCLC 251325323
 Nussbaum, Louis-Frédéric and Käthe Roth. (2005).  Japan encyclopedia. Cambridge: Harvard University Press. ;  OCLC 58053128
 Titsingh, Isaac. (1834). Nihon Odai Ichiran; ou,  Annales des empereurs du Japon.  Paris: Royal Asiatic Society, Oriental Translation Fund of Great Britain and Ireland. OCLC 5850691
 Varley, H. Paul. (1980). A Chronicle of Gods and Sovereigns: Jinnō Shōtōki of Kitabatake Chikafusa. New York: Columbia University Press. ;  OCLC 6042764

External links
 National Diet Library, "The Japanese Calendar" -- historical overview plus illustrative images from library's collection

Japanese eras
10th century in Japan